Sam O'Neill, known by his stage name TCTS, is an English DJ and record producer from Manchester. He is signed to Chase & Status' record label, MTA. O'Neill is best known for his 2014 song "Games", which reached number 29 on the UK Dance Chart.

Career
TCTS' debut EP, Hands, was released on 15 May 2012 through Cool Kid Music. He released a single, "1997", through Bondax's label Just Us on 10 September 2012. The signing came about after he submitted the song to Rob Adcock's BBC Introducing from Stoke radio show and Bondax heard it played on Huw Stephens' BBC Radio 1 show. His second EP, These Heights, was released on 11 November 2013 through Greco-Roman. Pitchfork's Larry Fitzmaurice described the release as "warm and weird".

His third EP, "Games", was released through MTA Records on 8 July 2014. The title track features vocals from KStewart, the sister of Example's ex-band-member David Stewart. Earmilk described the song as "a choppy synth-driven production with bouncy dance floor appeal". It entered the UK Singles Chart at number 117. Stereogum described "You", a promotional single from the EP, as "an effervescent house cut built around melancholy piano, rubbery synths, and an assured yet emotionally wrecked vocal". His next EP, Body, was released on 29 March 2015 and was preceded by its promotional singles "Thinking About You" and "Coupe de Ville".

O'Neill has received extensive airplay on BBC Radio 1Xtra, received support from Huw Stephens, Annie Mac and Rob da Bank's BBC Radio 1 shows and also appeared for a guest mix on Triple J.

Discography

Extended plays

Singles

Remixes

References

Living people
English electronic musicians
Musicians from Manchester
Year of birth missing (living people)